Maricarmen Reyes Zárate (born 23 April 2000) is a footballer who plays as a midfielder for Liga MX Femenil club Tigres UANL. Born and raised in the United States to Mexican parents, she represents Mexico internationally.

Early life
Reyes was born in Fountain Valley, California and raised in Santa Ana, California to Mexican parents, who hailed from Zamora, Michoacán.

College career
She scored the winning goal in overtime of the final game of the 2022 NCAA Division I women's soccer tournament.

International career
On 21 September 2021, Reyes scored her first goal for the Mexico national team in a 2–0 victory over Colombia at Estadio Azteca.

Personal life
Reyes' brother Oscar, a footballer as well, also played for the UCLA Bruins. Unlike her, her brother was born in Mexico and has represented the United States (at under-17 level).

Career statistics

International 

Scores and results list Mexico's goal tally first, score column indicates score after each Mexico goal.

Honours 
UCLA Bruins
 NCAA Division I Women's Soccer Championship: 2022

References

External links

2000 births
Living people
Citizens of Mexico through descent
Mexican women's footballers
Women's association football midfielders
Mexico women's international footballers
People from Fountain Valley, California
Sportspeople from Orange County, California
Soccer players from California
Sportspeople from Santa Ana, California
American women's soccer players
UCLA Bruins women's soccer players
American sportspeople of Mexican descent